The 2009 Stan James World Matchplay was the 16th annual staging of the World Matchplay tournament by the Professional Darts Corporation. The tournament took place from 19–26 July 2009. As usual it was staged at the Winter Gardens in Blackpool.

World number one Phil Taylor successfully defended his title, beating Terry Jenkins in the final to win his tenth World Matchplay.

Prize fund
The prize fund was increased to £400,000, which was £100,000 more than the last World Matchplay.

Qualification
The qualification process for the World Matchplay differed this year. The top 16 in the PDC Order of the Merit after the 2009 UK Open qualified automatically as the 16 seeds. The other 16 places would be made up of the 16 highest ranked players (not already in the top 16) from the 2009 Players Championship Order of Merit - decided by the various Player Championship events taking place on the PDC Pro Tour from January 2009 - the cutoff point was the Las Vegas Players Championship just before the 2009 Las Vegas Desert Classic.

Thus, the participants were:

PDC Top 16
  Phil Taylor (winner)
  James Wade (quarter-finals)
  Raymond van Barneveld (quarter-finals)
  John Part (first round)
  Mervyn King (semi-finals)
  Terry Jenkins (runner-up)
  Ronnie Baxter (semi-finals)
  Adrian Lewis (quarter-finals)
  Colin Lloyd (second round)
  Alan Tabern (second round)
  Dennis Priestley (first round)
  Colin Osborne (first round)
  Wayne Mardle (second round)
  Mark Walsh (second round)
  Andy Hamilton (first round)
  Kevin Painter (second round)

PDPA Players Championship qualifiers
  Gary Anderson (second round)
  Robert Thornton (first round)
  Andy Smith (first round)
  Wayne Jones (first round)
  Mark Dudbridge (first round)
  Michael van Gerwen (first round)
  Steve Beaton (second round)
  Vincent van der Voort (quarter-finals)
  Jamie Caven (first round)
  Denis Ovens (second round)
  Jelle Klaasen (first round)
  Co Stompé (first round)
  Tony Eccles (first round)
  Peter Wright (first round)
  Andy Jenkins (first round)
  Wes Newton (first round)

Draw

Statistics

References

World Matchplay (darts)
World Matchplay Darts